Viagrande (Sicilian: Varanni) is a comune (municipality) in the Metropolitan City of Catania in the Italian region Sicily, located about  southeast of Palermo and about  north of Catania.

Viagrande borders the following municipalities: Aci Bonaccorsi, Aci Sant'Antonio, San Giovanni la Punta, Trecastagni, Zafferana Etnea.

Gallery

References

External links

 

Cities and towns in Sicily